Inuit TV is a Canadian licence-exempted Category B specialty television channel owned by Inuit TV Network.

The channel broadcasts programming primarily in Inuktituk, with supplementary programming in English, with the stated purpose to inform, educate, entertain, and promote and preserve the Inuit languages, identity, and culture. The channel is recognized as a regional educational broadcaster by the government of Nunavut.

The channel launched on May 2, 2022, on Shaw Direct.

References

External links
Official website

2022 establishments in Canada
Television channels and stations established in 2022
Indigenous television in Canada
Inuktitut